E.F.C.C. Tung Fook Church, is a Christian church based in Hong Kong. Established in August 1991, it is part of the Evangelical Free Church of China. The main place of worship is located on 11  in the Causeway Bay area, Hong Kong Island. It had an initial congregation of a few dozens in 1991. 2005 estimate is around 2,500. In 2010, the church has grown up to 4,500.

It has 5 places of worship, located in the Causeway Bay, Chai Wan, Tuen Mun, Kwun Tong and Tung Chung respectively; In 2017, Tung Fook Church Kowloon West, became a separate congregation, E.F.C.C. Jachin Church.

The church building of Tung Fook Church in the Causeway Bay, which next to the Victoria Park, was known for the neon sign "Jesus is Lord" in Chinese.

References

External links

  

Protestant churches in Hong Kong
Causeway Bay
Evangelical Free Church of China